John S. Strong is an American academic, who is the Charles A. Dana Professor Emeritus of Religious Studies at Bates College. Strong specializes in Buddhist studies and with emphasis on the Buddha's biography, relics, and the legends and cults of South Asia.

John Strong was born in China, and completed his secondary education in Switzerland. He graduated from the Oberlin College, where he joined the Phi Beta Kappa Society. He then obtained a master's degree at the Hartford Seminary Foundation.

Strong received his Ph.D. in History of Religions from the University of Chicago in 1977, and joined Bates in 1978. He received a fellowship from the National Endowment for the Humanities in 1982, as an Assistant Professor of Religion. He was promoted to a full professor in 1986.

Research
Strong's research program is in the area of Buddhist Studies, with a special focus on Buddhist legendary and cultic traditions in India and South Asia. He has received fellowships for his work from the National Endowment for the Humanities, the Fulbright Foundation and the Guggenheim Foundation, and has been a visiting professor at the University of Peradeniya, the University of Chicago, and Harvard, Princeton, and Stanford Universities.  He is the author of numerous articles and of The Legend of King Asoka (Princeton, 1983), The Legend and Cult of Upagupta(Princeton, 1992), The Experience of Buddhism (Wadsworth, 1995), The Buddha: A Beginner’s Guide (OneWorld Publications, 2001), Relics of the Buddha (Princeton, 2004), and Buddhisms: An Introduction (OneWorld, 2015).

See also 
 Trapusa and Bahalika

References

External links 
 Profile at Bates
 2011 CV

Living people
American Buddhist studies scholars
American religion academics
Bates College faculty
Hartford Seminary alumni
University of Chicago alumni
1948 births